The following is a list of events, births, and deaths in 1855 in Switzerland.

Incumbents 
Federal Council:
Jakob Stämpfli 
Jonas Furrer (President)
Josef Munzinger 
Henri Druey then Constant Fornerod
Friedrich Frey-Herosé 
Wilhelm Matthias Naeff 
Stefano Franscini

Events 
 ETH Zurich, the Federal Polytechnic, opens
 Botanist Carl Meissner gives Grevillea ramosissima its current name and first describes Grevillea thyrsoides
 The Oberwinterthur railway station and Winterthur main railway station open
 The Swiss Benevolent Society of New Orleans is founded
 Switzerland opens a consulate in Sydney, Australia

Arts and literature 
 Green Henry is first published

Births 
 February 18 - Adolf Frey, writer and literary historian (d. 1920)
 July 16 - Rodolphe Lindt, chocolate manufacturer and inventor (d. 1909)
 September 16 - Eugène Penard, biologist (d. 1954)
 December 19 - Carl Joseph Schröter, botanist (d. 1939)
 Arnold Lang, naturalist (d. 1914)
 Meta von Salis, feminist and historian (d. 1929)

Deaths 
 February 6 - Josef Munzinger, member of the Swiss Federal Council (b. 1791)
 March 29 - Henri Druey, member of the Swiss Federal Council (b. 1799)

References 

 
Years of the 19th century in Switzerland